John I of Ponthieu ( – 1191) was the son of Guy II of Ponthieu and succeeded him as Count of Ponthieu in 1147.

War with Normandy
John attacked Normandy in 1166 and 1168, in response to King Henry II of England's confiscation of the castles at Alençon, La Roche-Mabile and the Alenconnais. Henry, angry with John's rebellion, led his army on a path of destruction across Vimeu, the south-west part of Ponthieu.

Family
John married Beatrice of Saint-Pol, they had:
 William IV Talvas

Notes

References

Ponthieu, John I of
Counts of Ponthieu
Year of birth uncertain
12th-century Normans
Christians of the Third Crusade